Louise Brough and Margaret duPont were the defending champions but did not compete.

Angela Mortimer and Anne Shilcock defeated Shirley Bloomer and Pat Ward in the final, 7–5, 6–1 to win the ladies' doubles tennis title at the 1955 Wimbledon Championships. To date it remains the last all-British women's doubles final.

Seeds

  Barbara Davidson /  Doris Hart (second round)
  Beverly Fleitz /  Darlene Hard (semifinals)
  Shirley Bloomer /  Pat Ward (final)
  Angela Mortimer /  Anne Shilcock (champions)

Draw

Finals

Top half

Section 1

Section 2

Bottom half

Section 3

Section 4

References

External links

Women's Doubles
Wimbledon Championship by year – Women's doubles
Wimbledon Championships
Wimbledon Championships